Amphibolothrips is a genus of thrips in the family Phlaeothripidae.

Species
 Amphibolothrips grassii
 Amphibolothrips knechteli
 Amphibolothrips marginatus

References

Phlaeothripidae
Thrips
Thrips genera